Kaiyuan West railway station is an intermediate station on the Harbin–Dalian high-speed railway. It is in Kaiyuan, Tieling, Liaoning, China. It opened along with the railway on 1 December 2012.

See also
Kaiyuan railway station

References

Railway stations in Liaoning
Railway stations in China opened in 2012